David Northrup (born 1 May 1941) is emeritus professor of history at Boston College. He is the former president of the World History Association and in 2017 received their Pioneers in World History Award.

Selected publications
 Seven Myths of Africa in World History. Indianapolis : Hackett Publishing Company, Inc. 2017 
 Africa's Discovery of Europe: 1450-1850. New York : Oxford UP, 2014.  
 How English Became the Global Language. New York : Palgrave Macmillan, 2013 
 Crosscurrents in the Black Atlantic, 1770-1965: A Brief History with Documents. New York : Bedford/St. Martin's, 2010. 
 Indentured Labor in the Age of Imperialism, 1834-1922 New York : Cambridge University Press, 1995 
 The Atlantic Slave Trade. Lexington: Heath, 1994. (2002, 2001)  (Editor)
 Beyond the Bend in the River: African Labor in Eastern Zaire, 1865-1940. Athens, Ohio : Ohio University Center for International Studies, 1988. 
 Trade Without Rulers: Pre-Colonial Economic Development in South-Eastern Nigeria. Oxford : Clarendon Press, 1978

References

External links 
http://worldhistoryconnected.press.uillinois.edu/2.1/northrup.html

Living people
1941 births
Boston College faculty
American historians
Historians of slavery
Historians of Africa
Presidents of the World History Association